William John Denehy (29 May 1889 – 24 November 1960) was an Australian rules footballer who played with University in the Victorian Football League (VFL).

Denehy entered Melbourne University in 1907, where he was a resident student at Trinity College studying Medicine. In 1917, he returned to Melbourne University as Stewart Scholar and Demonstrator in Medicine.

References

External links

1889 births
Australian rules footballers from Melbourne
University Football Club players
People educated at Melbourne Grammar School
People educated at Trinity College (University of Melbourne)
1960 deaths
People from Brunswick, Victoria